Hart Building may refer to:

Hart Building (Marysville, California), listed on the National Register of Historic Places in Yuba County, California
Hart Building (Williamsport, Pennsylvania), listed on the National Register of Historic Places in Lycoming County, Pennsylvania
Hart Senate Office Building, Washington, D.C.

See also
Hart House (disambiguation)